Eupithecia nublae is a moth in the family Geometridae. It is found in the Region of Biobio (Nuble Province) in Chile. The habitat consists of the Northern Valdivian Forest Biotic Province.

The length of the forewings is about 10.6 mm for females. The forewings are unicolorous dark brown. The hindwings are greyish white anteriorly, becoming dark brown posteriorly. Adults have been recorded on wing in September.

Etymology
The specific name is based on the type locality.

References

Moths described in 1987
nublae
Moths of South America
Endemic fauna of Chile